Pell is a surname shared by several notable people, listed below 

 Axel Rudi Pell (born 1960), German heavy metal guitar player and member of Steeler and founder of his own eponymous band
 Charles Pell (1874–1936), American college football coach 
 Charley Pell (1941–2001), American college football player and coach
 Claiborne Pell (1918–2009), U.S. Senator from Rhode Island, serving six terms from 1961 to 1997, and sponsor of the Pell Grant, which provides financial aid funding to American college students
 Dave Pell (1925–2017), American jazz saxophonist and bandleader
 Ella Ferris Pell (1846–1922), American painter, sculptor, and illustrator
 Eva J. Pell (born 1948), American biologist, plant pathologist, and science administrator
 George Pell (1941–2023), Australian cardinal of the Catholic Church
 Harry Pell (born 1991), English professional footballer
 Herbert Pell (1884–1961), American Representative from New York, U.S. Minister to Portugal, U.S. Minister to Hungary, and an instigator and member of the United Nations War Crimes Commission
 Isabel Pell (1900–1951), American socialite and member of the French Resistance
 John Pell (mathematician) (1611–1685), English mathematician. See also Pell's equation
 Morris Birkbeck Pell (1827–1879), American-Australian mathematician, professor, lawyer and actuary
 Philip Pell (1753–1811), American politician and lawyer who served in the New York State Assembly and as a delegate for New York to the Confederation Congress.
 Thomas Pell (1608–1669), an English-born physician who emigrated to United States
William Pell (tenor) (1947–2003), American opera singer
William Pell (footballer) (1883-1915), English footballer
William Pell (minister) (1634–1698), English minister

See also
Pelle (surname)

de:Pell
fr:Pell